Tetrahydroxy-1,4-benzoquinone, also called tetrahydroxy-p-benzoquinone, tetrahydroxybenzoquinone, or tetrahydroxyquinone (THBQ, THQ), is an organic compound with formula .  Its molecular structure consists of a cyclohexadiene ring with four hydroxyl groups and two ketone groups in opposite (para) positions.

The compound gives a light red solution in water, and crystallizes as the glistening bluish-black (but non-conducting) dihydrate .

The compound can be synthesized from glyoxal or from myo-inositol, a natural compound widely present in plants.  THBQ forms an adduct with 4,4′-bipyridine in a 2:3 ratio.

Salts of THBQ
The latter is symmetric and aromatic, as the double bonds and negative charges are evenly distributed over the six CO groups.

The calcium salt  is the dark purple pigment produced from inositol by Chromohalobacter beijerinckii in the fermentation of salt beans, already noted by T. Hof in 1935.

The dark purple and insoluble dipotassium salt  was prepared by Preisler and Berger in 1942, by oxidizing inositol with nitric acid and reacting the result with potassium carbonate in the presence of oxygen. Reaction of this salt with hydrochloric acid produces THBQ in good yield.

The black tetrapotassium salt  was prepared by West and Niu in 1962, by reacting THBQ with potassium methoxide in methanol. The salt is diamagnetic and the infrared spectrum suggests that the C–C and C–O distances are all equal, with the ring slightly distorted in the "chair" conformation. Partial oxidation of  affords a green, strongly paramagnetic solid, conjectured to be , and complete oxidation yields potassium rhodizonate .

The greenish-black sodium salt  was described by Fatiadi and Sanger in 1962.

The dark-violet lithium salt  has been proposed as an electrode material for batteries as it can be oxidized to the rhodizonate  and reduced to the hexahydroxybenzene salt . In the absence of oxygen,  is stable to about 450 °C and then decomposes leaving a residue of lithium carbonate.  Indeed, the rhodizonate appears to disproportionate at about 400 °C into  and cyclohexanehexone  that promptly decomposes into carbon monoxide, carbon dioxide, and carbon.   forms a hydrate  that loses its water at about 250 °C.

References

Organic acids
1,4-Benzoquinones
Tetrols
Hydroxybenzoquinones
Polyphenols